Frontier Worlds is a BBC Books original novel written by Peter Anghelides and based on the long-running British science fiction television series Doctor Who. It features the Eighth Doctor, Fitz and Compassion.

Frontier Worlds was named "Best Eighth Doctor Novel" in the annual Doctor Who Magazine poll of its readers.

External links
The Cloister Library - Frontier Worlds

Reviews
The Whoniverse's review on Frontier Worlds

1999 British novels
1999 science fiction novels
Eighth Doctor Adventures